Polish–Slovak relations are foreign relations between Poland and Slovakia. Both nations are members of the European Union and NATO. Both joined the EU simultaneously on 1 May 2004. Both countries form together with the Czech Republic and Hungary the Visegrád Group, which is an important regional group in Central Europe.

Both countries share 539 km of common borders.

Resident diplomatic missions 
 Poland has an embassy in Bratislava.
 Slovakia has an embassy in Warsaw and a consulate-general in Kraków.

See also  
 Foreign relations of Poland 
 Foreign relations of Slovakia
 Czechoslovakia–Poland relations
 2004 enlargement of the European Union
 Slovaks in Poland
 Poles in Slovakia

Notes

External links 
 Polish embassy in Bratislava
 Slovak embassy in Warsaw

 

 
Slovakia
Bilateral relations of Slovakia